Trier is an electoral constituency (German: Wahlkreis) represented in the Bundestag. It elects one member via first-past-the-post voting. Under the current constituency numbering system, it is designated as constituency 203. It is located in western Rhineland-Palatinate, comprising the city of Trier and the district of Trier-Saarburg.

Trier was created for the inaugural 1949 federal election. Since 2021, it has been represented by Verena Hubertz of the Social Democratic Party (SPD).

Geography
Trier is located in western Rhineland-Palatinate. As of the 2021 federal election, it comprises the independent city of Trier and the district of Trier-Saarburg.

History
Trier was created in 1949. In the 1949 election, it was Rhineland-Palatinate constituency 7 in the numbering system. In the 1953 through 1976 elections, it was number 154. In the 1980 through 1998 elections, it was number 152. In the 2002 election, it was number 206. In the 2005 election, it was number 205. In the 2009 and 2013 elections, it was number 204. Since the 2017 election, it has been number 203.

Originally, the constituency comprised the city of Trier, and the districts of Landkreis Trier and Saarburg. It acquired its current borders in the 1972 election.

Members
The constituency has been held by the Christian Democratic Union (CDU) during all but two Bundestag terms since its creation. It was first represented by Heinrich Kemper of the CDU from 1949 to 1957, followed by Alois Zimmer until 1965 and Heinrich Holkenbrink until 1969. Carl-Ludwig Wagner then served from 1969 to 1976. Günther Schartz was representative from 1976 to 1994. Franz Peter Basten served a single term from 1994 to 1998 before Karl Diller won the constituency for the Social Democratic Party (SPD) in 1998. He served two terms. Bernhard Kaster regained it for the CDU in 2005 and served until 2017. Andreas Steier was elected in 2017. Verena Hubertz of the SPD won the constituency in 2021.

Election results

2021 election

2017 election

2013 election

2009 election

References

Federal electoral districts in Rhineland-Palatinate
1949 establishments in West Germany
Constituencies established in 1949
Trier
Trier-Saarburg